is a Japanese television jidaigeki or period drama that was broadcast in 1975. It is based on Shōtarō Ikenami's novel by the same title. Tetsuro Tamba plays the role of Heizō Hasegawa.

Plot
The Tokugawa shogunate set special police called Hitsuke Tozoku aratamegata to crack down on crimes. Hasegawa Heizō is a chief of Hitsuke Tōzoku Aratamegata. He is a talented man and feared like an oni by thieves. On the other hand, he is a man with big heart, and some former thieves impressed by his personality are now working for him. Hasegawa and his subordinates help each other to arrest thieves.

Cast

Tetsuro Tamba as Hasegawa Heizō (Onihei)
Ichirō Nakatani as Izeki Rokunosuke
Yoko Nogiwa as Omasa
Katsutoshi Arata as Kumehachi
Takahiro Tamura as Kishii Samanosuke
Kayo Matsuo as Otaki
Akio Hasegawa as Harada
Kokonte Shinshō as Kimura Chūgo (Usagi)
Ryōhei Uchida as Ōtaki no Gorozō
Hiroshi Koizumi as Sashima Tadasuke
Akihiko Hirata as Kyōgoku Bizen

See also
Onihei Hankachō
Onihei Hankachō(1989 TV)

References

1975 Japanese television series debuts
1970s drama television series
Jidaigeki television series
Television shows based on Japanese novels